Stonyx is a genus of bee flies, insects in the family Bombyliidae. There are about five described species in Stonyx.

Species
These five species belong to the genus Stonyx:
 Stonyx clelia Osten Sacken, 1886 i c g b
 Stonyx clotho (Wiedemann, 1830) i c g
 Stonyx lacera (Wiedemann, 1830) i c g
 Stonyx lelia Williston, 1901 i c g
 Stonyx melia Williston, 1901 i c g
Data sources: i = ITIS, c = Catalogue of Life, g = GBIF, b = Bugguide.net

References

Further reading

 

Bombyliidae genera
Articles created by Qbugbot